Decepticon (possibly misspelled as Deceptacon) is a faction in Transformers.

Deceptacon may also refer to:
 "Deceptacon", a song by Le Tigre from Le Tigre
 "Deceptacon", a song by Robbie Williams from Reality Killed the Video Star
 "Deceptacons", a song by One Be Lo from S.O.N.O.G.R.A.M.